William Ian Gasarch (born 1959) is an American computer scientist known for his work in computational complexity theory, computability theory, computational learning theory, and Ramsey theory. He is currently a professor at the University of Maryland Department of Computer Science with an affiliate appointment in Mathematics.

As of 2015 he has supervised over 40 high school students on research projects, including Jacob Lurie. He has co-blogged on computational complexity with Lance Fortnow since 2007.  He was book review editor for ACM SIGACT NEWS from 1997 to 2015.

Education
Gasarch received his doctorate in computer science from Harvard in 1985, advised by Harry R. Lewis.  His thesis was titled Recursion-Theoretic Techniques in Complexity Theory and Combinatorics. He was hired into a tenure track professorial job at the University of Maryland in the Fall of 1985. He was promoted to Associate Professor with Tenure in 1991, and to Full Professor in 1998.

Work
Gasarch co-founded (with Richard Beigel) the field of  Bounded Queries in Recursion Theory and has written many papers in the area capped off by a book on the topic  co-authored with Georgia Martin,  titled Bounded Queries in Recursion Theory. He's published books such as Problems with a Point, a book with a broad view on mathematics and theoretical computer science which he co-authored with Clyde Kruskal and includes works by other professors such as David Eppstein. He also co-founded the subfield of recursion-theoretic  inductive inference named Learning via Queries with Carl Smith. More recently he has been more involved with combinatorics, notably Ramsey Theory. He has written two surveys of what theorists think of  the P vs NP problem.

Blog
Lance Fortnow began writing a blog on theoretical computer science with an emphasis on complexity theory in 2002. Gasarch was a frequent guest blogger until 2007 when he became an official co-blogger.

References

External links
 Gasarch's Homepage

Living people
American computer scientists
Computability theorists
University of Maryland, College Park faculty
Harvard University alumni
Science bloggers
1959 births